Born of Unknown Father is a 1950 French film directed by Maurice Cloche.

Cast
Yvonne Dany
Irasema Dilián	... 	Rose Dormoy
Gabrielle Dorziat	... 	Mme. Mussot
Irene Genna	... 	Antoinette
Gilbert Gil	... 	Raymond Denis
Jean-Pierre Kérien	... 	Claude Nogent
Claude Le Lorrain
Charles Lemontier	... 	Le président
Héléna Manson	... 	Mme Denis
Renzo Merusi	... 	Pierre Neville
Gaby Morlay	... 	Mme. Nogent
Van Mullen	... 	Maître Mussot
Sandro Ruffini	... 	Henri Mussot
Nicole Stéphane	... 	Jacqueline Mussot
Max Tréjean
Janine Viénot	... 	La surveillante de l'Assistance Publique

External links
 

1950 films
1950s French-language films
Films directed by Maurice Cloche
French drama films
1950 drama films
French black-and-white films
1950s French films